The 2005 State of Origin series saw the 24th time that the annual three-game series between the Queensland and New South Wales representative rugby league football teams was contested entirely under 'state of origin' selection rules. The three matches drew a total attendance of 187,309 and New South Wales won the series 2-1, their third consecutive series victory, and their last until 2014.

The Wally Lewis Medal for Player of the Series was awarded to New South Wales' fullback, Anthony Minichiello. The Ron McAuliffe Medal for Queensland player of the series was awarded to Cameron Smith. The Brad Fittler Medal for New South Wales player of the series was awarded to Matt King.



Game I

The crowd of 52,484 people at Suncorp Stadium was a record for the ground at the time. After fifty minutes, Queensland had raced away to a 19-0 lead. However New South Wales, under new coach Ricky Stuart made a strong comeback, bringing the score to 20-19 in their favour. A field goal from Johnathan Thurston, in his first match for the Maroons, saw the game go into 'golden point' extra time. Brett Kimmorley, playing halfback in place of an injured Andrew Johns, threw a pass intended for Matt King, but was instead intercepted by Matt Bowen, who snatched a 24-20 victory for the Maroons.

Game II

Having made his first NRL reappearance just ten days earlier following recovery from injury, Andrew Johns made his State of Origin comeback for Game II with a man-of-the-match performance to help level the 2005 series. This game opened with the Blues sustaining immense pressure on their own line for the opening 15 minutes of the match before breaking through for a try to Minichiello to open the scoring.

Game III

After 25 years the 2005 decider was the 75th game between the two sides, with 36 wins for each side.
After an hour New South Wales had raced away to a 32-0 lead and late tries to Queensland proved too little too late. Matt King became only the ninth player (and fourth New South Welshman) to score a hat-trick in State of Origin.

New South Wales squad

Queensland squad

See also
 2005 NRL season

Footnotes

External links
State of Origin 2005 at rugbyleagueproject.org

State of Origin series
State of Origin series